The Office is an American television sitcom broadcast on NBC. Created as an adaptation by Greg Daniels of the British series of the same name, it is a mockumentary that follows the day-to-day lives of the employees of the Scranton, Pennsylvania branch of Dunder Mifflin, a fictional paper supply company. The series ran on NBC in the United States from March 24, 2005, to May 16, 2013. Additionally, nine spin-off series of webisodes  of The Office have been aired on NBC.com.

The Office aired a short first season in 2005 that consisted of six episodes. This was followed by a full-length second season in 2005–06 that consisted of 22 episodes, and a third season in 2006–07, with 25 episodes. Due to the 2007–2008 Writers Guild of America strike, the fourth season that aired in 2007–08 consisted of 19 episodes.  The fifth season aired during 2008–09 and consisted of 28 episodes. The sixth season aired during 2009–10 and consisted of 26 episodes. The seventh season aired during 2010–11 and consisted of 26 episodes. The eighth season aired during 2011–12 and consisted of 24 episodes. The ninth season aired during 2012–13 and consisted of 25 episodes. A total of 201 episodes of The Office aired over nine seasons.

The first set of webisodes, titled The Accountants, consisted of ten episodes and ran between the second and third seasons. Kevin's Loan consisted of four episodes and ran between the fourth and fifth seasons. The Outburst aired in the middle of the fifth season and consisted of four episodes. Blackmail aired during the end of the fifth season and consisted of four episodes. Subtle Sexuality aired during the beginning of the sixth season and consisted of three episodes. The Mentor aired near the end of the sixth season and consisted of four episodes. The 3rd Floor aired during the beginning of the seventh season and consisted of three episodes. The Podcast aired near the middle of the seventh season (was previously available on the season 6 DVD) and consisted of three episodes. The latest webisode series, The Girl Next Door aired at the end of the seventh season and had two episodes.

All nine seasons are available on DVD in regions 1, 2, and 4. Starting with season five, the series is available on Blu-ray. This list is ordered by the episodes' original air dates and not by the production code numbers provided by NBC's official episode guide, which show the order in which episodes were filmed.

After the acquisition of the series by the streaming service Peacock, extended format episodes designated "Superfan Episodes" were released beginning in 2021 exclusive to Peacock, including deleted scenes and additional footage.

Series overview

Episodes

Season 1 (2005)

Season one aired between March 24 and April 26, 2005. It originally debuted as a midseason replacement for Committed. It carried over general plot ideas from the earlier British series created by Stephen Merchant and Ricky Gervais, and particularly the threat of wholesale downsizing. However, only the pilot was a direct adaptation of one of the UK version's episodes.

This season introduced the main characters, and established the general plot as a documentary crew is recording the lives of the employees of the fictitious Dunder Mifflin Paper Company. In a mockumentary format, it shows Michael Scott (Steve Carell), regional manager of the Scranton branch office, as he tries to convince the filmmakers of the documentary that he presides over a happy, well-running office. Meanwhile, sales rep Jim Halpert (John Krasinski) finds methods to undermine his cube-mate, Dwight Schrute (Rainn Wilson); receptionist Pam Beesly (Jenna Fischer) is trying to deal with Michael's insensitivities and flubs; and the temporary employee Ryan Howard (B. J. Novak) is acting mostly as an observer of the insanity around him.

Season 2 (2005–06)

Season two of The Office premiered on September 20, 2005, and ended on May 11, 2006. NBC initially ordered only six episodes for the season, and in September, ordered seven more. On November 3, 2005, NBC ordered an additional three, and in the end it had ordered a full season of 22 episodes.

The second season further developed into the plot of the fear of company downsizing, along with the introduction of new characters and developing some of the minor ones—especially that of Dwight. As Michael starts a relationship with his boss Jan Levinson (Melora Hardin), Pam and Jim's relationship become one of the focal points of the season. Their compatibility becomes more obvious as Jim's feelings for Pam continue to grow, while she struggles with her relationship with the warehouse worker Roy Anderson (David Denman).

Season 3 (2006–07)

Season three premiered on September 21, 2006, and ended on May 17, 2007. It featured 25 episodes, including two hour-long episodes, six "super-sized" episodes, and guest directors such as J. J. Abrams, Joss Whedon and Harold Ramis.

The season marked the move of main character Jim Halpert from Scranton to Stamford, and also introduced Rashida Jones as Karen Filippelli, and Ed Helms as Andy Bernard (both members of Dunder Mifflin Stamford) as recurring characters.  Helms would later be promoted to series regular.  The main plot for the early episodes of the season deals with a recurring problem in seasons one and two—the problem of company downsizing—while in the latter half of the season, inter-office relationships also became a major plot point.  Metacritic, which assigns normalized ratings out of 100 to critics' reviews, calculated an average score of 85/100 based on five collected reviews, indicating "universal acclaim".

Season 4 (2007–08)

NBC ordered a full fourth season of The Office consisting of 30 episodes, which included five one-hour specials.  However, the 2007–2008 Writers Guild of America strike shut down production for nearly five months in the middle of the season (between the episodes "The Deposition" and "Dinner Party"). Because of the shutdown, the fourth season of The Office only consisted of 19 half-hour episodes, ten of which were paired as five hour-long episodes. The season premiered on September 27, 2007.

Season four marked the departure of Karen Filippelli as a regular character, although she appeared for a few seconds in the first episode, "Fun Run"; and was featured as the regional manager of the Utica branch in the sixth episode, "Branch Wars". Relationships emerged as the main theme of the season, with Jim and Pam's and Michael and Jan's rising, as well as Dwight and Angela's declining.  Technology was another theme as the office staff struggled with initiatives introduced by Ryan to modernize the company.

Season 5 (2008–09)

On April 10, 2008, NBC ordered a fifth season consisting of 28 half-hour episodes, four of which were paired as two hour-long episodes. The season premiered on September 25, 2008.

This season highlighted Michael's roller coaster relationship with corporate, as he is first praised and rewarded for impressive numbers despite the economic downturn. However, when a new boss is hired Michael feels slighted by his controlling manner.  The theme of the beginning and middle of the season was mostly personal relationships with Dwight, Angela, Andy, Jim, Pam, Michael, Jan, and Holly. However, the theme transformed into career growth, as Ryan, Pam, and Michael set up the Michael Scott Paper Company, Pam and Michael go on a lecture circuit, Charles takes Jan's and Ryan's job, and Jim has trouble getting on with Charles.  The last few episodes of the season focused on relationships once again, with major events taking place in Jim and Pam's relationship, and also with Holly and Michael.

Season 6 (2009–10)

On January 15, 2009, it was announced that NBC renewed the series for a sixth season, consisting of 26 half-hour episodes, four of which were paired as two hour-long episodes. The season premiered on September 17, 2009.

Story arcs in the sixth season include Jim becoming co-manager with Michael of the Scranton branch, Michael dating Pam's mother, Dwight attempting to get Jim fired, and Dunder Mifflin facing an uncertain future due to rumors of insolvency, eventually becoming part of a larger corporation called Sabre. The season also prominently features the long-awaited wedding between Jim and Pam, as well as the birth of their first child.

Season 7 (2010–11)

On March 5, 2010, NBC officially announced that it had renewed The Office for a seventh season, consisting of 26 half-hour episodes, four of which were paired as two hour-long episodes. Steve Carell confirmed the season would be his last on the series. The season premiered on September 23, 2010.

The seventh season of The Office largely revolves around the character development and departure of Michael from the series. After Toby is called for jury duty, Holly returns, causing Michael to once again pursue her, despite her being in a relationship. After eventually proving himself to her, the two get engaged, but Michael decides to move to Boulder, Colorado to help Holly take care of her elderly parents. After Michael leaves, the office is forced to choose a new manager.

Season 8 (2011–12)

On March 17, 2011, NBC renewed The Office for an eighth season, consisting of 24 episodes. This season focuses on Andy Bernard becoming manager of the Scranton branch, before being replaced as manager by Nellie Bertram (Catherine Tate) midway through the season. James Spader also became a regular cast member, playing the role of Robert California, the new CEO of Sabre. Also, Jim and Pam welcome their second child.

The eighth season of The Office largely centers around the antics of the new Sabre CEO, Robert California. Initially, he appears calm, collected, and calculating. However, as the season progresses, it becomes obvious that his management style is slowly destroying the company. Dwight—along with Jim, Stanley, Ryan, Erin, and Cathy (Lindsey Broad)—travel to Florida to help set up a Sabre Store, where Nellie Bertram (Catherine Tate) is introduced. Eventually, former CFO of Dunder Mifflin David Wallace buys back the company, firing California.

Season 9 (2012–13)

On May 11, 2012, NBC renewed The Office for a ninth season, which was later announced to be the final season. The season consists of 25 episodes.

The ninth season largely focuses on the relationship between Jim and Pam Halpert. After Jim decides to follow his dream and start a sports marketing company in Philadelphia, Pam begins to worry about moving, and the couple's relationship experiences stress. Meanwhile, Andy abandons the office for a three-month boating trip, and eventually quits his job to pursue his dream of becoming a star. Dwight is then promoted to regional manager.

  denotes a "super-sized" 40-minute episode (with advertisements; actual runtime around 28 minutes).
  denotes an hour-long episode (with advertisements; actual runtime around 42 minutes).
  denotes an extended 75-minute episode (with advertisements; actual runtime around 52 minutes).

Ratings

Webisodes

The Accountants (2006)
NBC announced on March 16, 2006, that there would be ten original, stand-alone webisode shorts on NBC.com.  They debuted on July 13, and concluded on September 7, 2006. They were directed by Randall Einhorn and written by Michael Schur and Paul Lieberstein, and were edited by Michael Zurer, an assistant editor on the series. It took two days to film them, and in June 2007, The Accountants won the Comedy Short Award at the inaugural Webby Awards and  a Daytime Emmy Award for Outstanding Broadband Program – Comedy.  In November 2007, the webisodes became a point of argument for the Writers Guild of America for the 2007 strike, as none of the writers or actors featured in the webisodes were paid residuals for their participation.

Major characters Michael, Jim and Pam do not appear in The Accountants webisodes. Instead, the focus is on the three members of the accounting department: Oscar, Angela and Kevin—who appear in each webisode—as they try to find $3000 missing from the office budget. The series won an Emmy Award in the "Outstanding Broadband Program – Comedy" category at the 34th Daytime Emmy Awards in 2007. Tim Stack of Entertainment Weekly graded the series with an "A−" and wrote, "While we miss Jim and Pam (not to mention star Steve Carell), these shorts prove that spending time with their excessively awkward co-workers can be just as sweet."

Kevin's Loan (2008)
NBC ordered a new set of webisodes for the summer of 2008.  The webisode series began its run on July 10, 2008, and ended on July 31, 2008. The webisodes feature Kevin, who pursues a unique solution in an effort to pay back his looming gambling debts. The other characters who appeared are Oscar, Stanley and Darryl.

The Outburst (2008)
NBC ordered a new set of webisodes for the winter of 2008.  The webisode series began its run on November 20, 2008. The webisodes feature all of The Office characters except for Michael, Pam, Jim, Dwight and Ryan. Oscar has an outburst in the middle of the office and his coworkers start an investigation.

Blackmail (2009)
Creed decides to take up blackmail, and attempts to get money out of Oscar, Andy, Kelly, Angela, and Meredith.

Subtle Sexuality (2009)
Kelly and Erin form their own girl group, Subtle Sexuality, and get Ryan and Andy to assist them with their first music video, "Male Prima Donna".

The Mentor (2010)
Erin wants to make a career change and finds herself a mentor: Angela.

The 3rd Floor (2010)
Ryan attempts to make a horror film titled The 3rd Floor using Dunder Mifflin as a location, and workers such as Kelly, Erin, Gabe, Kevin and Meredith as actors. The 3rd Floor was written by Jonathan Hughes, Kelly Hannon and Mary Wall and directed by Mindy Kaling.

The Podcast (2011)
Gabe attempts to record a podcast in the office about the Sabre website, hoping to impress corporate. The webisodes were made available on January 20, 2011, on NBC.com, but were previously included on the season 6 DVD release.

The Girl Next Door (2011)
The series focuses on Kelly and Erin's girl group called Subtle Sexuality. The first webisode documents the behind-the-scenes aspects of their second single "The Girl Next Door", while the second and final webisode is the music video itself, which features Ryan. The webisodes were made available on May 4, 2011, on NBC.com.

References

External links
 
 

Lists of American sitcom episodes
 
NBCUniversal-related lists